Love King is a song by the American R&B artist The-Dream. It is the first single from his third studio album Love King. The song was premiered on February 17, 2010, on Def Jam's website. It was released digitally on March 16, 2010.

Music videos
The music video was shot in March 2010 with the director Lil' X in Atlanta. The video was premiered on Black Entertainment Television's 106 & Park on April 7, 2010. Another video for the remix with Ludacris was filmed on April 1, 2010, with the director Clifton Bell. It was premiered on May 5, 2010.

Remix
The remix features the rapper Ludacris. It was released on May 4, 2010. The second remix features the rapper Young Jeezy.

Critical reception
Vibe wrote, "Terius Nash's new leadoff record from "Love King" has no "-ellas," but it's still much of the same: fingersnaps, repetition, and an unescapable catchphrase (you don't know me like that!). We haven't heard mindless music that sounds this good since... The-Dream's last single."

Chart performance
"Love King" debuted on the Billboard Hot R&B/Hip Hop Songs chart at number 92 in the March 6, 2010, issue. It was officially sent to US radio stations on March 9, 2010. In the week following its release, it re-entered the chart at number 67, and reached its peak at number 37 the following. In the next week, due to the song gaining strong digital sales, it debuted on the Billboard Hot 100 at number 92 but fell off the chart the following week. The song later returned onto the chart at #97 but again fell off the following week.

Charts

References

2010 songs
The-Dream songs
Music videos directed by Director X
Songs written by The-Dream
Songs written by Carlos McKinney
Song recordings produced by The-Dream
Def Jam Recordings singles
2010 singles